Fable (alternatively Legend ) is a 2000 Mandarin album by Beijing-based C-pop singer Faye Wong.

The album can be considered in three sections. The first five tracks deal with certain aspects of Buddhism, incorporating motifs from fairy tales, especially Cinderella. The next three are radio-friendly pop songs. The next two, "Farewell Firefly" and "Book of Laughter and Forgetting," are somewhat more complex musically; they are sung in Mandarin and are followed by alternate versions in Cantonese, "Firefly" and "Love Letters to Myself."

The first five songs form a song cycle and were composed by Faye Wong herself, marking her further development as a songwriter. Three of them featured as the final segment of every performance in Wong's 2010–2012 Comeback Tour.

All the lyrics on the album are by Lin Xi, and tracks 1–5 were produced by Zhang Yadong, both of whom were regularly collaborating with Wong during this period of her career. Alvin Leong produced tracks 6–12.

Track listing

All songs are in Mandarin except for tracks 11 and 12, which are Cantonese versions of tracks 9 and 10 respectively.

Other versions
A "Deluxe" version included a VCD with footage of Faye Wong's commercial for Head & Shoulders shampoo.

References

2000 albums
Faye Wong albums
Mandopop albums
EMI Records albums
Religious music albums by Chinese artists
Buddhist music albums